David Ernest Hornell VC (26 January 1910 – 24 June 1944) was a Canadian recipient of the Victoria Cross, the highest and most prestigious award for gallantry in the face of the enemy that can be awarded to British and Commonwealth forces.

Early life
David "Bud" Hornell was born on Toronto Island and spent his later childhood and adolescence in the Toronto suburb of Mimico. He attended Mimico High School, having obtained the Fred Werden scholarship, given in memory of the son of Mimico's postmaster, who was killed in the First World War.

Second World War
He enlisted in the Royal Canadian Air Force in January 1941, and received his pilot's wings in September the same year. After further instruction in Charlottetown, Prince Edward Island, he was posted to the Royal Canadian Air Force station on North Vancouver Island. Commissioned in 1942, Flight Lieutenant Hornell completed 60 operational missions, involving some 600 hours flying.

Victoria Cross
Flight Lieutenant Hornell was flying as aircraft captain on a Consolidated Canso amphibian aircraft with 162 (Bomber Reconnaissance) Squadron, RCAF, from RAF Wick in Northern Scotland, when the following action took place for which he was awarded the VC.

Nevertheless he and his crew succeeded in sinking the submarine. Hornell then managed to bring his burning aircraft down on the heavy swell. There was only one serviceable dinghy, which could not hold all the crew, so they took turns in the cold water.

By the time the survivors were rescued 21 hours later, Hornell was blinded and weak from exposure and cold. He died shortly after being picked up. He is buried in Lerwick Cemetery, Shetland Islands.

Citation

Legacy

David Hornell Junior School, an elementary school in Mimico is named after him.

The Canso aircraft in the collection of the Canadian Warplane Heritage Museum in Hamilton, Ontario, was restored in the colours and markings of 162 (Bomber Reconnaissance) Squadron and dedicated to the memory of Flight Lieutenant David Hornell, VC.

A squadron of the Royal Canadian Air Cadets in the west end of Toronto, Ontario, is named after him.

A Toronto Island Airport ferry is named after Hornell 

The Wing Operations building at CFB 14 Wing Greenwood, Nova Scotia, Canada is named after Hornell.

His Victoria Cross is on loan to 1 Canadian Air Division Headquarters in Winnipeg and is on display at the Air Force Heritage Museum.

References

External links
 Canadian Government Veterans Affairs biography and citation: HORNELL, David Ernest

1910 births
1944 deaths
Military personnel from Toronto
Canadian military personnel killed in World War II
Canadian World War II pilots
Canadian World War II recipients of the Victoria Cross
Deaths from hypothermia
People from Etobicoke
Royal Canadian Air Force officers
Royal Canadian Air Force personnel of World War II
Shot-down aviators
Burials in Scotland